Livni is an Israeli surname and it may refer to:

Eitan Livni (1919–1991) Zionist activist, Irgun commander and Israeli politician
Eti Livni (born 1948) Israeli politician
Tzipi Livni (born 1958) Israeli foreign minister, politician, and daughter of Eitan Livni

Hebrew-language surnames